Maria Claire Adorna (born July 13, 1993) is a professional Filipina triathlete and swimmer. She is the head coach of One Percent Coaching

Education
Adorna attended the University of the Philippines Diliman for her college studies.

Collegiate career
At the 2010 CHED National Games, Adorna won seven gold medals for her regional team, National Capital Region as a swimming competitor. She won the events of women's 400m Individual medley, 50m freestyle, 100m freestyle, 100m butterfly, 50m backstroke and 4x50-meter relay events.

International career
Adorna's first international competition was the 2014 New Taipei ASTC Triathlon Asian Cup which took place at the New Taipei Breeze Canal on June 14, 2014. She trained under Portuguese Sergio Santos for a month before the tournament. She finished third behind champion, Hoi Long from Macau and Choi Yan Yin from Hong Kong.

At the ULAH Tri United 1 at Dungaree Beach in Subic Bay Freeport held on March 1, 2015, Adorna finished second behind Australian Mitch Robins.

Adorna won the gold at the triathlon event at the 2015 Southeast Asian Games behind fellow Filipina Kim Mangrobang on June 6, winning the first gold medal for her country of that year's Games.

Adorna, part of the Philippine triathlon team has decided to skip the 2016 Hatsukaichi ASTC Triathlon Asian Championships due to ongoing recovery process from her left knee injury.

She was among the two athletes that represented the Philippines at the 2019 World Beach Games. Adorna competed in aquathlon where she finished 25th out of 28 competitors.

Awards
Adorna received the national 2013 Swimmer of the Year, as well as the women's elite 2014 Triathlete of the Year award at the 2014 SwimBikeRun Awards.

References

1993 births
Living people
Filipino female triathletes
Filipino female swimmers
Triathletes at the 2014 Asian Games
University of the Philippines Diliman alumni
Place of birth missing (living people)
Southeast Asian Games gold medalists for the Philippines
Southeast Asian Games competitors for the Philippines
Southeast Asian Games silver medalists for the Philippines
Southeast Asian Games medalists in triathlon
Triathletes at the 2018 Asian Games
Competitors at the 2015 Southeast Asian Games
Competitors at the 2017 Southeast Asian Games
Asian Games competitors for the Philippines
Competitors at the 2019 Southeast Asian Games